"Heartache Tonight" is a song written by Don Henley, Glenn Frey, Bob Seger and J. D. Souther, recorded by the Eagles and features Glenn Frey on lead vocals. The track was included on their album The Long Run and released as a single in 1979. It reached No. 1 on the U.S. Billboard Hot 100 in November of that year and was certified Platinum by the Recording Industry Association of America representing one million copies sold.  It was the Eagles' final chart-topping song on the Hot 100.

Composition
The song originated from an electric jam session between Frey and Souther, who would visit Frey's home in Los Angeles whenever he was in town on tour. Frey and Souther wrote the first verse while listening to Sam Cooke songs. In the heat of jamming, Frey called Seger on the phone and sang him the verse. Seger then blurted out the chorus. According to Frey, "J.D. [Souther], Don and I finished that song up. No heavy lyrics -- the song is more of a romp -- and that's what it was intended to be." The song was covered by country music singer John Anderson on the tribute album Common Thread: The Songs of the Eagles, by Michael Bublé on his album Crazy Love, and by Tom Jones on his 1980s TV show.

Seger said:

Reception
Billboard suggested that the handclaps provided "more of a young, vital sound" than previous Eagles' songs and particularly praised the guitar break and the vocal harmonies.  Cash Box said it has a "partyin' country-rock groove."  Record World highlighted the "slashing rhythm, big beat, whining guitars, & Glenn Frey's tough vocals."

The recording received a 1979 Grammy Award for Best Rock Performance by a Duo or Group with Vocal.

Personnel
Glenn Frey: lead vocals, rhythm guitar, handclapping
Don Henley: drums, backing vocals
Joe Walsh: slide guitar
Don Felder: rhythm guitar
Timothy B. Schmit: bass guitar, backing vocals
Bob Seger: backing vocals (not credited on album liner notes)

Chart performance

Weekly charts

Year-end charts

Conway Twitty version

"Heartache Tonight" was revived four years later in a cover version by country music artist Conway Twitty. Released as the second single from his Lost in the Feeling album, Twitty's version reached No. 6 on the Billboard Hot Country Singles chart in the fall of 1983.

Twitty's version featured the Osmond Brothers on backing vocals. Allmusic reviewer Thom Jurek wrote that "Heartache Tonight" and its follow-up single, "Three Times a Lady," "offer(ed) a solid view of Twitty's amazing crossover potential, and his ability to take well-known pop tracks and turn them into solid country smashes long after the countrypolitan days of Chet Atkins and RCA."  (In addition to "Three Times a Lady" (a cover of a song by [the Commodores]]), Twitty had successfully covered "Slow Hand" and "The Rose," previously popular hits for the Pointer Sisters and Bette Midler.)

Chart performance

References

1979 singles
1983 singles
1993 singles
Billboard Hot 100 number-one singles
Cashbox number-one singles
Songs written by Glenn Frey
Songs written by Don Henley
Eagles (band) songs
Conway Twitty songs
John Anderson (musician) songs
Songs written by Bob Seger
Songs about heartache 
RPM Top Singles number-one singles
Songs written by J. D. Souther
Song recordings produced by Jimmy Bowen
Song recordings produced by Bill Szymczyk
Asylum Records singles
Warner Records singles
1979 songs